Mastaura may refer to:
Mastaura (Caria)
Mastaura (Lycia)